An airplane house or aeroplane house is a residential home made from a retired or scrapped aircraft. The houses are usually old airliners that once carried passengers, but have now been sent to a scrap yard because of age or because of cuts in the airline's fleet.

Information

People buy the airplane from the scrap yard and use the frame as a base for a house.

These houses typically have the same area as a normal house, but in a different shape. Lighting, heating, air conditioning, and plumbing can be installed once the plane is transported to its final destination from the scrap yard. The plane houses often have the cockpit and back of the plane turned into either a bedroom or bathroom. There is usually a room in the middle which is another bedroom. The remaining area can be turned into a living room and kitchen.

Because airplanes are made to fly at high altitudes, they are well insulated. As a result, the homes constructed from them are energy efficient. These houses also have ample storage area. The cargo hold underneath, normally used to carry customer luggage, is now available to use as an attic-type storage area and the wings can be converted into decks.

The average cost to build varies from about $35,000 to $55,000. This comprises the plane, land, plumbing, electrical, heating/air conditioning, and the cost of transporting the plane from the scrap yard.

Construction
Once it is bought from the scrap yard the wings may be removed from the aircraft and put onto flatbeds to transport it to the buyer's property. At the buyer's yard a crane will be used to reattach the wings.

Advantages
The entire project costs less than most suburban homes and requires less maintenance. Also there might be no mortgage on the property which means the owner will own their home without debt sooner. It is also a good home for first time buyers because it is inexpensive as well as a full size house. In addition to low building costs it is inexpensive to heat and cool. The fuselage is designed to be well insulated because aircraft fuselages must hold up to extreme cold at high altitudes.

Costs
Depending on the place, condition, and age of the aircraft, customers are able to buy them from $10,000 to $30,000.

In some areas of the country suburban land of that size is available for around $15,000. It will take several tractor trailer trucks to transport the entire plane when it is dismantled. Depending on the company fees and the distance that the plane is being transported, the fee will most likely be a few thousand dollars.

See also
 747 Wing House
 Boeing
 Boeing 727
 Airbus
 Aircraft boneyard

References

External links
 Airplane Homes web site
 Boeing 727-200 home project web site
 Boeing 727-200 home project updates (not linked from home page)

House types
Aircraft by type